Peggy is a 1950 American comedy film directed by Frederick De Cordova, and starring Diana Lynn, Charles Coburn, and Charlotte Greenwood.

The film's art direction was by Bernard Herzbrun and Richard H. Riedel.

Plot

Cast
 Diana Lynn as Peggy Brookfield 
 Charles Coburn as Professor "Brooks" Brookfield 
 Charlotte Greenwood as Mrs. Emelia Fielding
 Barbara Lawrence as Susan Brookfield 
 Charles Drake as Tom Fielding
 Rock Hudson as Johnny "Scat" Mitchell
 Connie Gilchrist as Miss Zim, the Nurse
 Griff Barnett as Dr. Philip Wilcox
 James Todd as Mr. Gardiner
 Jerome Cowan as Fred Collins
 Charles Trowbridge as Dean William Stockwell
 Ellen Corby as Mrs. Privet, the Librarian
 Donna Martell as Contestant
 James Best as Frank Addison
 Lucille Barkley as Contestant
 Peter Brocco as Bob Winters

References

Bibliography
 Bego, Mark. Rock Hudson: public and private. Penguin Group, 1986.

External links
 

1950 films
1950 comedy films
American comedy films
American football films
Films about competitions
Films directed by Frederick de Cordova
Films set in Pasadena, California
Universal Pictures films
1950s English-language films
1950s American films